Andrew James Arellano (born January 16, 1980) is a Filipino actor and host. He is one of the traveling hosts of the daily morning show, Unang Hirit and the host of informative/educational show AHA! on GMA Network. He is also the host of the now defunct show Balikbayan, and Biyahe ni Drew on QTV (now GTV).

Early life and career
Arellano was born to Aga Arellano and Bernie Estrella Arellano on January 16, 1980, in San Jose, California, USA. He has two brothers and two sisters. He graduated high school at Xavier School Manila in March 1997, and he graduated Marketing Management at De La Salle University in October 2001 (also the same university as his wife Iya Villania). Arellano formerly worked in an advertising agency before he began his showbiz career. Arellano's first stint in showbiz on TV was in a youth-oriented show called Click, with longtime girlfriend and now wife, Iya Villania. He won his first solo award from PMPC Star Awards For TV as 'Best Travel Show Host' for Balikbayan, formerly aired on QTV 11 (then GMA News TV; now GTV 27), and a year later he won again in a same category.  He also won the Unang Hirit Barkada for Unang Hirit as 'Best Morning Show Hosts' also at PMPC Star Awards For TV, three times in a row.

Arellano currently hosts AHA!, an informative/educational show on GMA Network, and the travel show Biyahe ni Drew on GMA News TV which has garnered several fans as it explores the beautiful islands of the Philippines and the countries outside it. He has remarkably shown talent in his job which paved way to his long running show "Biyahe ni Drew".

Personal life
Arellano enjoys basketball and triathlon which has won him various medals in a triathlon competition held every year.

On January 31, 2014, Arellano married Iya Villania, his girlfriend. Their wedding was held in Nasugbu, Batangas. They have four children: Antonio Primo (born 2016), Alonzo Leon (born 2018), Alana Lauren (born 2020), and Astro Phoenix (born 2022).

Arellano is a practicing Catholic. In January 2022, Arellano, alongside Villania and their three children, tested positive for COVID-19.

Filmography

Television

Film
 Spirit of the Glass (Regal Entertainment)
 My First Romance (Star Cinema)

Awards and nominations

Notes

References

External links

1980 births
Living people
American people of Filipino descent
American emigrants to the Philippines
Participants in Philippine reality television series
Filipino Roman Catholics
Filipino male film actors
GMA Network personalities
GMA Integrated News and Public Affairs people
Filipino television personalities